"Fill Me In" is the debut solo single of British singer Craig David. It was released on 3 April 2000 as the lead single from his debut studio album, Born to Do It (2000). The song debuted at number one on the UK Singles Chart on 9 April 2000. "Fill Me In" was then released in the United States on 22 May 2001 and peaked at number 15 on the Billboard Hot 100. According to the Official Charts Company, it was the 10th-best-selling single of 2000 in the UK, having sold 573,000 copies.

The track contains a sample from an Artful Dodger bootleg remix of BBMak's "Still on Your Side". There is a second part of the song which features on the US edition of Born to Do It.

Content
The narrator tells a story of trying to spend time with the girl next door, but her parents remain suspicious about what she is doing. The song is a commentary on the "helicopter parenting" that was becoming more prominent in the early 2000s. In the hook, the parents ask if their daughter can fill them in on what is going on in her life.

Chart performance
After his success with Artful Dodger, David's first solo hit debuted at number one in the UK top 40 on the week of 15 April 2000. "Fill Me In" topped the charts during a week in which all of the top six positions were new entries. After one week atop the chart, "Fill Me In" dropped to number two for two weeks, replaced at number one by Fragma's "Toca's Miracle". The single logged 10 weeks inside the top 40. On 28 December 2009, when BBC Radio 1 presenter Nihal revealed "The Official Top 100 Songs of the Decade", "Fill Me In" was at number 93.

The single was released in the United States on 22 May 2001. On 30 June, "Fill Me In" entered the Billboard Hot 100 top 40 at number 28. The song climbed into the top 20 the following week, remaining there until October and peaking at number 15 on 1 September. In total, David remained 23 weeks inside the US top 40 before leaving on 8 December.

Music video
There are different versions of the music video released in the UK and in the US. The UK music video, directed by Max & Dania, has David telling a story about how he tried many times to romance his girlfriend who lived next door to him but each of his attempts to be alone with his girlfriend failed as his girlfriend's parents always interrupted and he had to hide before they left again. According to an interview on his first Greatest Hits album, the girl in the UK music video is a South African woman whose identity has never been known. The US version, directed by Darren Grant, has a different picturisation and this time David's girlfriend is mixed race.

Track listings

UK CD1
 "Fill Me In" (radio edit) – 3:52
 "Apartment 543" – 4:21
 "Fill Me In" (Artful Dodger Bootleg mix) – 3:59
 "Fill Me In" (video CD-ROM) – 3:52

UK CD2
 "Fill Me In" (radio edit) – 3:52
 "Fill Me In" (Artful Dodger remix) – 5:53
 "Fill Me In" (Sunship remix) – 5:38
 "Fill Me In" (Full Crew remix) – 4:18

UK cassette single
 "Fill Me In" (radio edit) – 3:52
 "Apartment 543" – 4:21
 "Fill Me In" (Artful Dodger Bootleg mix) – 3:59

European CD single
 "Fill Me In" (radio edit) – 3:52
 "Fill Me In" (Sunship remix) – 5:38

European maxi-CD single
 "Fill Me In" (radio edit) – 3:52
 "Fill Me In" (Artful Dodger's Bootleg mix) – 3:59
 "Fill Me In" (Artful Dodger remix) – 5:53
 "Fill Me In" (Full Crew remix) – 4:18
 "Fill Me In" (Sunship remix) – 5:38

Australian CD single
 "Fill Me In" (radio edit) – 3:52
 "Fill Me In" (Artful Dodger's Bootleg mix) – 3:59
 "Apartment 543" – 4:21
 "Fill Me In" (Sunship remix) – 5:38
 "Fill Me In" (Full Crew remix) – 4:18
 "Fill Me In" (Artful Dodger mix) – 5:53
 "Fill Me In" (video CD-ROM)

US CD single
 "Fill Me In" (radio edit) – 3:50
 "Fill Me In" (Full Crew remix) – 4:12
 Snippets ("Rendezvous" / "7 Days" / "Walking Away")

Canadian CD single
 "Fill Me In" (album version) – 4:15
 "Fill Me In" (Full Crew mix) – 4:12
 "Fill Me In" (Blacksmith mix) – 3:20
 "Fill Me In" (Sunship remix) – 5:53
 "Fill Me In" (Artful Dodger remix) – 6:21
 "Fill Me In" (Artful Dodger Bootleg remix) – 6:05
 "Fill Me In" (album instrumental) – 4:12
 "Fill Me In" (radio edit) – 3:50
 "Fill Me In" (live) – 10:36

Charts

Weekly charts

Year-end charts

Decade-end charts

Certifications

Release history

Cover versions and remixes

Loud Luxury remix
In 2017, Canadian house music production and DJ duo Loud Luxury released a remix of the song which featured Ryan Shepherd. In 2022, the song was certified Gold in Canada.

Certifications

References

2000 debut singles
2000 songs
Atlantic Records singles
Craig David songs
Music videos directed by Darren Grant
Songs written by Craig David
Songs written by Mark Hill (musician)
UK garage songs
UK Singles Chart number-one singles